Edward Mooney may refer to:
 Edward Aloysius Mooney (1882–1958), Roman Catholic Cardinal Archbishop of Detroit, former Bishop of Rochester
 Edward F. Mooney (born 1941), Kierkegaard scholar and professor of religion at Syracuse University
 Edward Ludlow Mooney (1813–1887), American painter
 Peter Mooney (footballer) (Edward Mooney, 1897–?), English footballer